Singlet oxygen, systematically named dioxygen(singlet) and dioxidene, is a gaseous inorganic chemical with the formula O=O (also written as  or ), which is in a quantum state where all electrons are spin paired. It is kinetically unstable at ambient temperature, but the rate of decay is slow.

The lowest excited state of the diatomic oxygen molecule is a singlet state.
It is a gas with physical properties differing only subtly from those of the more prevalent triplet ground state of O2.  In terms of its chemical reactivity, however, singlet oxygen is far more reactive toward organic compounds.  It is responsible for the photodegradation of many materials but can be put to constructive use in preparative organic chemistry and photodynamic therapy. Trace amounts of singlet oxygen are found in the upper atmosphere and also in polluted urban atmospheres where it contributes to the formation of lung-damaging nitrogen dioxide. It often appears and coexists confounded in environments that also generate ozone, such as pine forests with photodegradation of turpentine.

The terms 'singlet oxygen' and 'triplet oxygen' derive from each form's number of electron spins. The singlet has only one possible arrangement of electron spins with a total quantum spin of 0, while the triplet has three possible arrangements of electron spins with a total quantum spin of 1, corresponding to three degenerate states.

In spectroscopic notation, the lowest singlet and triplet forms of O2 are labeled 1Δg and 3Σ, respectively.

Electronic structure 

Singlet oxygen refers to one of two singlet electronic excited states. The two singlet states are denoted 1Σ and 1Δg (the preceding superscript "1" indicates a singlet state).  The singlet states of oxygen are 158 and 95 kilojoules per mole higher in energy than the triplet ground state of oxygen. Under most common laboratory conditions, the higher energy 1Σ singlet state rapidly converts to the more stable, lower energy 1Δg singlet state. This more stable of the two excited states has its two valence electrons spin-paired in one π* orbital while the second π* orbital is empty. This state is referred to by the title term, singlet oxygen, commonly abbreviated 1O2, to distinguish it from the triplet ground state molecule, 3O2.

Molecular orbital theory predicts the electronic ground state denoted by the molecular term symbol 3Σ, and two low-lying excited singlet states with term symbols 1Δg and 1Σ.  These three electronic states differ only in the spin and the occupancy of oxygen's two antibonding πg-orbitals, which are degenerate (equal in energy). These two orbitals are classified as antibonding and are of higher energy. Following Hund's first rule, in the ground state, these electrons are unpaired and have like (same) spin. This open-shell triplet ground state of molecular oxygen differs from most stable diatomic molecules, which have singlet (1Σ) ground states.

Two less stable, higher energy excited states are readily accessible from this ground state, again in accordance with Hund's first rule; the first moves one of the high energy unpaired ground state electrons from one degenerate orbital to the other, where it "flips" and pairs the other, and creates a new state, a singlet state referred to as the 1Δg state (a term symbol, where the preceding superscripted "1" indicates it as a singlet state). Alternatively, both electrons can remain in their degenerate ground state orbitals, but the spin of one can "flip" so that it is now opposite to the second (i.e., it is still in a separate degenerate orbital, but no longer of like spin); this also creates a new state, a singlet state referred to as the 1Σ state. The ground and first two singlet excited states of oxygen can be described by the simple scheme in the figure below.

The 1Δg singlet state is 7882.4 cm−1 above the triplet 3Σ ground state., which in other units corresponds to 94.29 kJ/mol or 0.9773 eV. The 1Σ singlet is 13 120.9 cm−1 (157.0 kJ/mol or 1.6268 eV) above the ground state.

Radiative  transitions  between  the  three  low-lying electronic states of oxygen are formally forbidden  as electric dipole  processes. The two singlet-triplet transitions are forbidden both because of the spin selection rule ΔS = 0 and because of the parity rule that g-g transitions are forbidden. The singlet-singlet transition between the two excited states is spin-allowed but parity-forbidden.

The lower, O2(1Δg) state is commonly referred to as singlet oxygen. The energy difference of 94.3 kJ/mol between ground state and singlet oxygen corresponds to a forbidden singlet-triplet transition in the near-infrared at ~1270 nm. As a consequence, singlet oxygen in the gas phase is relatively long lived (54-86 milliseconds), although interaction with solvents reduces the lifetime to microseconds or even nanoseconds. In 2021, the lifetime of airborne singlet oxygen at  air/solid interfaces was measured to be 550 microseconds.

The higher 1Σ state is very short lived. In the gas phase, it relaxes primarily to the ground state triplet with a mean lifetime of 11.8 s. However in solvents such as CS2 and CCl4, it relaxes to the lower singlet 1Δg in milliseconds due to nonradiative decay channels.

Paramagnetism due to orbital angular momentum
Both singlet oxygen states have no unpaired electrons and therefore no net electron spin. The 1Δg is however paramagnetic as shown by the observation of an electron paramagnetic resonance (EPR) spectrum. The paramagnetism of the 1Δg state is due to a net orbital (and not spin) electronic angular momentum. In a magnetic field the degeneracy of the  levels is split into two levels with z projections of angular momenta +1ħ and −1ħ around the molecular axis. The magnetic transition between these levels gives rise to the  EPR transition.

Production 
Various methods for the production of singlet oxygen exist. Irradiation of oxygen gas in the presence of an organic dye as a sensitizer, such as rose bengal, methylene blue, or porphyrins—a photochemical method—results in its production. Large steady state concentrations of singlet oxygen are reported from the reaction of triplet excited state pyruvic acid with dissolved oxygen in water. Singlet oxygen can also be produced in non-photochemical, preparative chemical procedures. One chemical method involves the decomposition of triethylsilyl hydrotrioxide generated in situ from triethylsilane and ozone.

(C2H5)3SiH + O3 → (C2H5)3SiOOOH → (C2H5)3SiOH + O2(1Δg)

Another method uses the aqueous reaction of hydrogen peroxide with sodium hypochlorite:

 H2O2 + NaOCl → O2(1Δg) + NaCl + H2O

A third method liberates singlet oxygen via phosphite ozonides, which are, in turn, generated in situ such as triphenyl phosphite ozonide. Phosphite ozonides will decompose to give singlet oxygen:

(RO)3P  +  O3  →    (RO)3PO3
(RO)3PO3  →   (RO)3PO  +  O2(1Δg)

An advantage of this method is that it is amenable to non-aqueous conditions.

Reactions

Because of differences in their electron shells, singlet and triplet oxygen differ in their chemical properties; singlet oxygen is highly reactive. The lifetime of singlet oxygen depends on the medium.  In normal organic solvents, the lifetime is only a few microseconds whereas in solvents lacking C-H bonds, the lifetime can be as long as seconds.

Organic chemistry 
Unlike ground state oxygen, singlet oxygen participates in Diels–Alder [4+2]- and [2+2]-cycloaddition reactions and formal concerted ene reactions.  It oxidizes thioethers to sulfoxides.  Organometallic complexes are often degraded by singlet oxygen. With some substrates 1,2-dioxetanes are formed; cyclic dienes such as 1,3-cyclohexadiene form [4+2] cycloaddition adducts.

The [4+2]-cycloaddition between singlet oxygen and furans is widely used in organic synthesis.

In singlet oxygen reactions with alkenic allyl groups, e.g., citronella, shown, by abstraction of the allylic proton, in an ene-like reaction, yielding the allyl hydroperoxide, R–O–OH (R = alkyl), which can then be reduced to the corresponding allylic alcohol.
 
In reactions with water trioxidane, an unusual molecule with three consecutive linked oxygen atoms, is formed.

Biochemistry 

In photosynthesis, singlet oxygen can be produced from the light-harvesting chlorophyll molecules. One of the roles of carotenoids in photosynthetic systems is to prevent damage caused by produced singlet oxygen by either removing excess light energy from chlorophyll molecules or quenching the singlet oxygen molecules directly.

In mammalian biology, singlet oxygen is one of the reactive oxygen species, which is linked to oxidation of LDL cholesterol and resultant cardiovascular effects.  Polyphenol antioxidants can scavenge and reduce concentrations of reactive oxygen species and may prevent such deleterious oxidative effects.

Ingestion of pigments capable of producing singlet oxygen with activation by light can produce severe photosensitivity of skin (see phototoxicity, photosensitivity in humans, photodermatitis, phytophotodermatitis). This is especially a concern in herbivorous animals (see Photosensitivity in animals).

Singlet oxygen is the active species in photodynamic therapy.

Analytical and physical chemistry 

Direct detection of singlet oxygen is possible using sensitive laser spectroscopy  or through its extremely weak phosphorescence at 1270 nm, which is not visible. However, at high singlet oxygen concentrations, the fluorescence of the singlet oxygen "dimol" species—simultaneous emission from two singlet oxygen molecules upon collision—can be observed as a red glow at 634 nm and 703 nm.

References

Further reading 
 Bodner, G.M. (2002) Lecture Demonstration Movie Sheets: 8.4 Liquid Oxygen—Paramagnetism and Color, West Lafayette, IN, USA: Purdue University Department of Chemistry, see Liquid Oxygen---Paramagnetism and Color and Lecture Demonstration Movie Sheets, accessed 11 August 2015; alternatively, see Bodner, G.M.; K. Keyes & T.J. Greenbowe (1995) Purdue University Lecture Demonstration Manual, 2nd Edn, p. TBD, New York, NY, USA: John Wiley and Sons. [Earlier appearing reference on magnetic properties of oxygen states.]

External links 
 The NIST webbook on oxygen
 Photochemistry & Photobiology tutorial on Singlet Oxygen
 Demonstration of the Red Singlet Oxygen Dimol Emission (Purdue University)

Oxidizing agents
Physical chemistry
Allotropes of oxygen
Reactive oxygen species